Scoparia dispersa is a moth in the family Crambidae. It was described by Arthur Gardiner Butler in 1883. It is found in Chile.

References

Moths described in 1883
Scorparia
Endemic fauna of Chile